FGA may refer to:
 Fellow of the Ghana Academy of Arts and Sciences
 Fellow of the Gemmological Association
 Fibrinogen alpha chain, encoded by the FGA gene
 Field and Game Australia
 Fit/gap analysis
 Fleshgod Apocalypse, an Italian symphonic death metal band
 Florida Gulf & Atlantic Railroad
 Flugestone acetate
 Fondements de la Géometrie Algébrique, a mathematics text
 Foundation for Government Accountability, an American lobbying organization